Jurgen Pisani (born 3 September 1992) is a Maltese footballer who plays as a defender for Santa Lucia and the Malta national team.

Career
Pisani made his international debut for Malta on 15 November 2019 in a UEFA Euro 2020 qualifying match against Spain, which finished as a 0–7 away loss.

Career statistics

International

References

External links
 
 
 

1992 births
Living people
Maltese footballers
Malta youth international footballers
Malta under-21 international footballers
Malta international footballers
Association football defenders
Pietà Hotspurs F.C. players
Floriana F.C. players
Maltese Premier League players